Pseudo-operation can refer to:
A false flag operation, a covert military or paramilitary operation
In computer programming, an assembly language directive